The Castile and León autonomous basketball team is the basketball team of Castile and León. The team is not affiliated to FIBA, so only plays friendly games.

History
The first appearance of Castile and León was on 2005, in Burgos and they were defeated by Portugal. Next year, another friendly game was played this time at Palencia with Japan, and the team was defeated again.

In 2007, the Castile and León team was invited by the Portuguese Basketball Federation to play a tournament in Anadia. Castile and León won only one game against the 'B' team of Germany.

Roster
This is the roster of the Castile and León team for the 2007 Tournament in Anadia.

|}
| valign="top" |
 Head coach

 Assistant coaches

Legend
(C) Team captain
Club field describes pro clubduring the 2006–07 season
|}

Games played

References

External links
Castile and León Federation website

 
Spanish autonomous basketball teams